The 1996 English cricket season was the 97th in which the County Championship had been an official competition. England hosted tours by India and Pakistan, who each played three Tests and three ODIs. Against India, England were unbeaten, winning the Test series 1–0 and the ODI series 2–0. However, against the Pakistanis England lost 2–0 in the Tests, and had to console themselves with a 2–1 ODI series victory. 

In Hampshire's game against the Indians just before the third Test, Hampshire's Kevan James took four wickets in consecutive balls and then scored a century. This was the first time this particular "double" had ever been achieved in a first-class match.

The County Championship was won by Leicestershire for the second time (after 1975), and they celebrated their already certain title by defeating Middlesex by an innings on the last day of the season. Leicestershire finished 27 points in front of Derbyshire.  

In one-day cricket, the AXA Equity and Law League was won by Surrey on run rate from Nottinghamshire, while Lancashire claimed the honours in both the NatWest Trophy and the Benson & Hedges Cup. The best bowling figures of the season were claimed by Glen Chapple of Lancashire who took 6–18 in the NatWest Trophy final against Essex, in which the southern county were bowled out for an embarrassing 57.

Vince Wells' score of 201 in an earlier round of the NatWest Trophy was at the time only the fourth List A double century to have been scored.

Honours
County Championship – Leicestershire
NatWest Trophy – Lancashire
Sunday League – Surrey
Benson & Hedges Cup – Lancashire
Minor Counties Championship – Devon
MCCA Knockout Trophy – Cheshire
Second XI Championship – Warwickshire II 
Wisden – Sanath Jayasuriya, Mushtaq Ahmed, Saeed Anwar, Phil Simmons, Sachin Tendulkar

Statistical highlights
First-class
 Highest team total: 686 by Lancashire v Essex at Chelmsford, 7–10 June
 Lowest team total: 67 by Durham v Middlesex at Cardiff, 14 June
 Highest individual innings: 275* by Matthew Walker (Kent) v Somerset at Canterbury, 15–16 August
 Most runs in season: 1,944 by Graham Gooch (Essex)
 Best innings bowling: 9–38 by Cardigan Connor (Hampshire) v Gloucestershire at Southampton, 8–9 August
 Most wickets in season: 85 by Courtney Walsh (Gloucestershire)

List A
 Highest team total: 406/5 (60 overs) by Leicestershire v Berkshire at Leicester, 25 June
 Lowest team total: 48 by Leicestershire v Surrey at The Oval, 16 June
 Highest individual innings: 201 by Vince Wells (Leicestershire) v Berkshire at Leicester, 25 June
 Most runs in season: 1,151 by Dean Jones (Derbyshire)
 Best innings bowling: 6–18 by Glen Chapple (Lancashire) v Essex at Lord's, 7 September
 Most wickets in season: 56 by Adam Hollioake (Surrey)

Test series

India tour

Pakistan tour

County Championship

Sunday League

NatWest Trophy

Benson & Hedges Cup

Averages

First-class
Batting
Qualification: eight innings

Bowling
Qualification: ten wickets

List A
Batting
Qualification: eight innings

Bowling
Qualification: ten wickets

References

External sources
 CricketArchive – season and tournament itineraries

Annual reviews
 Playfair Cricket Annual 1997
 Wisden Cricketers' Almanack 1997

English cricket seasons in the 20th century
English Cricket Season, 1996
Cricket season